St. Gregory's High School & College is a Catholic school in Dhaka, Bangladesh. It was founded in 1882, when the city was part of British India, by Gregory De Groote, a Belgian Benedictine priest. The school, located on Municipal office street of Luxmibazar neighborhood of old Dhaka, was named after Pope Gregory I (540–604). Brother Ujjal Placid Pereira, CSC is the current principal of the institution.Brother Leonard Rozario,CSC is the current Vice principal of the institution.

History
In 1882, the American priests of the Congregation of Holy Cross took over the Vicariate of East Bengal from the Benedictine Fathers. At the time, Mr. and Mrs. Wise — who were Protestants — ran a school at present Wiseghat area near the River Buriganga. In this school, most of the students were of European and Anglo-Indian Catholic communities. Anglican and Baptist pastors were allowed to teach religion at this school. Father Francis Boers,C.S.C. tried many times to be a teacher of Catholic religion to the Catholic students at the school, but was not allowed. Out of frustration, he started an English-medium school on the grounds of the present adjoining St. Francis Xavier's Convent and girls' high school, that came into being later. The renamed St. Gregory's School shifted to the present site in 1896.

Until 1912, both boys and girls were students of St. Gregory's High School. When St. Francis Xavier Girls' School came into being in 1912, it became a boys' school. After creation of Pakistan in 1947, the school started the Bengali medium section. After the independence of Bangladesh in 1971, the school has only a Bengali medium section.

Early in 1914, a one-story building was torn down to make room for the present "Darjeeling" building and the latrines. Also the scout troop, the first in Dhaka, was started and had 40 scouts. Bengali replaced Latin as a second language in 1915. Later that year Father Crowley resigned as headmaster.

Basketball was introduced into the school in 1923, which is believed to be the first time basketball was played in the country. In July 1923, Father Hennessy gained permission to change the European style school to the Education Board examination. On June 2, 1924, permanent recognition was granted to St. Gregory's.

Professor Amartya Sen who won a Nobel Prize in Economics in 1998 had been a student of St. Gregory's . During a visit to Dhaka on December 19, 1998, he visited the school of his childhood and was present at a groundbreaking ceremony for the new school building.

In the year of 2016, the school was upgraded to Higher Secondary level by Ministry of Education of Government of People's Republic of Bangladesh. Since then, the institute has been registered as St. Gregory's High School & College.

Students of the school are known as "The Gregorians". The "Gregorian Association" is the official alumni association of this school founded in 1985.

1971 Massacre by the occupying Pakistani military:

Two of the three teachers of St. Gregory's High School who were murdered by the occupying Pakistani army in 1971 were kidnapped from the school premise on March 31, 1971. The teachers were taken to a nearby army camp in Jagannath College. On that day, the two teachers, Mr. N.C. Sutradhar and Mr. D.N. Pal Chaudhury, along with two of his teenage sons, Shoibal and Utpal who were students of St. Gregory's at the time, had been murdered. Mr. Monoranjan Poddar, a student of Jagannath College and Mr. Sutradhar's brother-in-law had also been kidnapped by the Pakistani army from the school and was murdered on March 31, 1971. At least 30 other people were taken from St. Gregory's High School that day who were also murdered by the Pakistani army. Brother Robert Hughes, C.S.C., the Headmaster of the school, tried to secure the two teachers’ release but failed.

The Pakistan army killed the retired teacher, Mr. Peter D'Costa, with 13 other villagers at Rangamatia Village of the then Dhaka District on November 26, 1971. For their respect this Memorial was made where every student of St. Gregory's High School show respect every year on 31 March.

Headmasters 

 Fr.Gregory De Groote (1882–1888)
 Fr.F.A.Boeres CSC (1889–1910)
 Fr.J.Fieffer (1911)
 Rev.Fr.T.Crowly CSC (1912–1915)
 Fr.P.Boulay CSC (1916–1918)
 Fr.A.Blin CSC (1919–1921)
 Bro.Bertin CSC (1922–1924)
 Fr.Finner CSC (1925–1926)
 Bro.Anthony CSC (1926–1929)
 Rev.Bro.Walter CSC (1929–1933) & (1935–1937)
 Bro.Neil CSC (1934)
 Bro.John Heim CSC (1938)
 Bro.Bernadine CSC (1939–1940)
 Bro.Jude CSC (1940–1950)
 Bro.James CSC (1950–1955)
 Bro.Martinian CSC (1955–1957)
 Bro.Fulgence CSC (1957–1962)
 Bro.Thomas Moore CSC (1962–1968)
 Bro.Robert CSC (1968–1977)
 Bro.John Rozario CSC (1977–1981)
 Bro.Gerald Kraegar (1981–1992)
 Bro.Marcel Duchesne (1992–1995)
 Bro.Bijoy Rodrigues CSC (1995)
 Fr.J.S.Peixotto CSC (1998–2000)
 Bro.Robi Purification CSC (1995–2012)
 Bro.Prodip Placid Gomes CSC (2012–2016)

Principals 

Bro.Prodip Placid Gomes CSC (2016 - 2021)
Bro. Leo J. Pereira, CSC (2022)
Bro. Ujjal Placid Pereira,CSC (2022–present)

Notable alumni

Politics
 Tajuddin Ahmad (first Prime Minister of Bangladesh)
 Kamal Hossain (Minister of Foreign Affairs, 1973–1975)
 A. Q. M. Badruddoza Chowdhury (President of Bangladesh, 2001–2002)
 Iftekhar Ahmed Chowdhury (Foreign Affairs Advisor)
 Hubert Costa (Member of Parliament of Poland)
 Osman Faruk (Minister of Education, 2001–2006)
 M. Osman Siddique (first U.S. ambassador to Fiji)
 A. K. Faezul Huq (politician, lawyer, and freelance journalist)
 Chowdhury Kamal Ibne Yusuf (Food and Disaster Management and Relief Minister, 2004–2006)
 Syed Najmuddin Hashim (diplomat)
 Faqueer (Fakir) Shahabuddin (first Attorney General of Bangladesh)
 Mizanur Rahman Shelley (Minister of Information and Broadcasting, and Minister of Irrigation, Water Development, and Flood Control, 1990)

Education
 Amartya Sen (Nobel laureate in Economics, 1998)
 Jamilur Reza Choudhury (Vice-Chancellor of BRAC University, Advisor of first Interim Government)
 Serajul Islam Choudhury

Culture
 Mustafa Zaman Abbasi (folk singer)
 Samar Das (performing artist)
 Shahriar Kabir (writer and human rights activist)
 Qazi Anwar Hussain (founder of 'SEBA Prokashoni' and the creator of famous character 'Masud Rana')
 Bhanu Bandopadhyay (comedian)
 Kaykobad (Bengali poet)
 Hayat Mamud (essayist-poet)
 Ali Zaker (actor and TV personality)
 Mahfuz Anam (editor of The Daily Star)
 Ziaur Rahman Zia (founder, Shironamhin Band)
                                                                                                                                                                                                                                                                                          
Sports  
                                                                                                                                                                                                                                                                                     
 Raqibul Hasan (first captain of Bangladesh Cricket Team)
 Raisuddin Ahmed (cricketer and cricket administrator)
 Enamul Hossain Rajib (5th Grandmaster of Bangladesh)
 Ashraful Haque (cricketer, chief-executive of Asian Cricket Council)

Scholarships
 A. K. Faezul Huq Scholarship

References

External links

 

Old Dhaka
Schools in Dhaka District
Holy Cross secondary schools
Catholic secondary schools in Bangladesh
Christianity in Dhaka
Educational institutions established in 1882
1882 establishments in British India
St. Gregory's High School and College